Sam Sexton (born 18 July 1984) is a British former professional boxer who competed from 2005 to 2018. At regional level, he held multiple heavyweight championships, including the Commonwealth title from 2009 to 2010, the British title from 2017 to 2018, and won the Prizefighter series in 2008.

Professional career

Early career
Sexton started his professional career in September 2005, in his home town of Norwich when he defeated Paul Bonson over six rounds at Carrow Road. He ended up compiling a record of 7-0 before he was defeated by former ABA champion Derek Chisora at the York Hall.  The referee stopped the fight with 26 seconds to go in the last round. A distraught Sexton said after the fight "Maybe the occasion got to me. I really don't know. I'll go back watch the fight probably have a week off. I'll be back straight. I just didn't feel myself, but I'm not one to make excuses. I boxed, I lost, that's just the way it is".

Prizefighter champion
On 12 September 2008, Sexton competed in the "Prizefighter" competition in Newcastle upon Tyne. He defeated Pelé Reid in the quarter-final and Luke Simpkin in the semi-final, both by unanimous decision. Sexton then defeated Chris Burton in the final, the only boxer with an unbeaten professional record, the fight was stopped 2:10 into the third and final round.  Talking of his pride at winning the tournament and picking up the £25,000 top prize, Sexton said: "Winning this is by far my top moment in boxing. I've represented England and that was fantastic boxing for my country but this is something completely different...I don't think I'm far off a British title shot now and I will see what I get offered. Hopefully I will be boxing for the British title as soon as possible."

Following the tournament Sexton returned to the ring in November in order to challenge for his first professional title belt, the Southern Area Championship. In the opposing corner, Colin Kenna was stopped in the 6th round to give Sexton his first professional belt.

Commonwealth heavyweight champion

Sexton vs. Rogan, Rogan II
Sexton fought Martin Rogan for his first defence of the Commonwealth heavyweight title, at the Odyssey, Belfast on 15 May 2009. Sexton defeated Rogan, handing him his first professional loss, after the doctor ruled that Rogan was unfit to continue in the 8th round due to a closed eye.

On 6 November at the same venue, he stopped Rogan in a rematch to retain his title. Rogan's corner threw in the towel before the start of the 7th round, handing Sexton the win. Rogan cited a neck injury preventing him using his left arm when interviewed afterwards, as the reason for being pulled out by his corner.

Sexton vs. Chisora II
On 13 February 2010, Sexton was due to fight Danny Williams for the British title at Wembley Arena but had to pull out with a hand injury. The fight was rearranged for May but Sexton pulled out after his mother suffered a brain aneurysm and was replaced by Derek Chisora. Sexton fought for the British title on 18 September, matched up against Derek Chisora. Sexton was stopped in the 9th round losing the second defence of his title.

Sexton vs. Price
On 19 May 2012, at Aintree Racecourse in Liverpool, Sexton was defeated by David Price by a fourth-round KO, in a fight for the vacant British and Commonwealth heavyweight titles. The fight was ordered by the BBBofC on 9 February after Tyson Fury vacated in order to step up. Price controlled the bout with his jab and distance, hurting Sexton badly whenever he connected. In the fourth round Price knocked Sexton out cold.

British heavyweight champion

Sexton vs. Cornish
On 6 October 2017, Sexton defeated Gary Cornish by unanimous decision and won the vacant British title at the Meadowbank Sports Centre, Edinburgh.

Sexton vs. Fury
On 14 February 2018, Hennessy Sports along with Infinitum announced that Sexton would make his first defence of the British heavyweight title at Macron Stadium's Premier Suite in Bolton on 12 May against Hughie Fury, live and exclusive on Channel 5. The bout would mark the first time in nearly seven years that the British title would be contested for on terrestrial TV. Speaking of the fight, Mick Hennessy said, "I'm delighted to bring the historic British Heavyweight Championship back to mainstream, free-to-air, television on Channel 5 where it will be seen by the biggest viewing audience possible due to their considerable reach and exposure. I can't believe that it will be nearly seven years since the British Heavyweight title was last seen on free-to-air in the UK on Channel 5." Fury started the fight moving around the ring throwing jabs and right hands. The movement looked to frustrate Sexton in round 3. Fury knocked Sexton down twice in the fight in dropping him in rounds 4 and 5. Fury won the British title defeating Sexton via TKO in round 5; Referee Terry O'Connor stopped the fight after Fury knocked Sexton down with a right hand in round 5. Sexton got back to his feet, but the referee stopped it anyway. The fight peaked at 2.9 million viewers.

Retirement
Sexton retired from boxing in December 2019.

Professional boxing record

References

External links

1984 births
Living people
Sportspeople from Norwich
English male boxers
Heavyweight boxers
Prizefighter contestants
Commonwealth Boxing Council champions
British Boxing Board of Control champions